Wendi Beth Rabiner Heinzelman is an American electrical engineer and computer scientist specializing in wireless networks, cloud computing, and multimedia. She is dean of the Hajim School of Engineering and Applied Sciences at the University of Rochester, and the former dean of graduate studies for arts, sciences, and engineering at Rochester.

Education and career
Heinzelman's parents worked as an electrical engineer and a teacher. She did her undergraduate studies at Cornell University, graduating in 1995 with a bachelor's degree in electrical engineering, and completed her Ph.D. in electrical engineering and computer science at the Massachusetts Institute of Technology in 2000. She joined the Rochester faculty in 2001.

Books
With Stanislava Soro, Heinzelman is the author of Resource Management Policies for Wireless and Visual Sensor Networks (VDM Publishing, 2008). With Lei Chen, she is the author of Protocols for Supporting QoS in Mobile Ad Hoc Networks (VDM Publishing, 2008). With Bulent Tavli, she is the author of Mobile Ad Hoc Networks: Energy-Efficient Real-Time Data Communications (Springer, 2006).

Recognition
Heinzelman was named Fellow of the Institute of Electrical and Electronics Engineers (IEEE) in 2016 for "contributions to algorithms, protocols, and architectures for wireless sensor and mobile networks".
She was elected as an ACM Fellow in 2018 for "contributions to wireless communication systems and protocols and leadership in broadening participation in computing".

References

External links
Home page

Living people
American computer scientists
American women computer scientists
MIT School of Engineering alumni
Cornell University College of Engineering alumni
Fellow Members of the IEEE
Fellows of the Association for Computing Machinery
Year of birth missing (living people)
21st-century American women